The Coastal Carolina Chanticleers baseball program has been the university's most consistent program in terms of success. Head Coach Gary Gilmore (903–464-1 at CCU, 1,156-566-3 overall) has led the Chanticleers to 16 NCAA Regional appearances and three Super Regional appearances since being hired in 1996. The program has received #1 regional seeds on five occasions (2005, 2007, 2008, 2010, 2018) and won 50+ games in 2005, 2007, 2008, 2010, and 2016. In addition, the Chanticleers hosted NCAA Regionals in 2007, 2008, 2010, and 2018. The program hosted a Super Regional in 2010 and won the 2016 College World Series.

Future Chicago White Sox major league pitcher Brad Goldberg played for the team in 2009-10, making 18 appearances (17 in relief) in those two seasons.

In 2010 Coastal went 29-0 in Big South play, winning both the regular season Big South Championship and the Big South Tournament Championship plus the Regional, but lost in the Super Regionals 2-0 to the University of South Carolina.

In 2016, Coastal went 21-3 in Big South play, winning the regular season Conference Championship and the Conference Tournament. In the 2016 post-season, Coastal won the Raleigh Regional by beating the NC State Wolfpack 2-1. The Chanticleers went on to beat the LSU Tigers 2-0 in the Baton Rouge Super Regionals, and ultimately got to the 2016 CWS Final and defeated Arizona two games to one to win the National Championship. The title game finished mere hours before Coastal officially left the Big South Conference, the school's home since 1983 (1984 baseball season), for the Sun Belt Conference. The state's governor Nikki Haley proclaimed July 1, 2016, the day after the title game and also Coastal's first official day as a Sun Belt member, "Chanticleer Baseball National Championship Day" throughout South Carolina.

Historically, Coastal's primary baseball rivals have been Winthrop, Liberty, and Charleston, although this may change following Coastal's move to the Sun Belt Conference.

NCAA Regional appearances

NCAA Super Regional appearances

NCAA College World Series appearances
On June 19, 2016, the Chanticleers baseball program made their first ever appearance in the CWS defeating #1 ranked Florida Gators. The Chanticleers made it through the double elimination bracket with one loss. In the Best of 3 Series against Arizona, the Chanticleers lost game 1 but rallied back to win games 2 and 3. On June 30, 2016 the Coastal Carolina Chanticleers defeated Arizona 4-3 in game 3 to become the 2016 NCAA Men's Baseball Champions.

Alumni on MLB Rosters 
In 2017, Coastal Carolina has had 3 former players on active MLB rosters. 
 Taylor Motter, SS - Seattle Mariners
 Tommy LaStella, 2B - Los Angeles Angels
 Jacob May, CF - Chicago White Sox, currently a free agent
In all, the university has produced 11 players on active MLB rosters, beginning with Mickey Brantley in 1987.

NCAA vs MLB Exhibition Game
On March 29, 2011 the Coastal Carolina baseball team scheduled an exhibition game against MLB's Texas Rangers at the Chanticleers home field for 2013, BB&T Coastal Field in Myrtle Beach, SC. The Rangers won the game 6-2.

See also
 List of NCAA Division I baseball programs

References

External links
 

 
Baseball teams established in 1954